How I Unleashed World War II is a Polish feature film made in 1969, based on Kazimierz Sławiński's novel "Przygody kanoniera Dolasa" (The Adventures of Dolas the Cannoneer). It was shot in Sochi, Baku, Poświętne and Łódź, among other places.

The film was divided into three parts:
Część I: Ucieczka (Part I: The Escape)
Część II: Za bronią (Part II: Following the Arms)
Część III: Wśród swoich (Part III: Among Friends)

Originally black and white, it was digitally colorized in 2001 by the Hollywood company Dynacs Digital Studios, as requested by the Studio Filmowe "Oko" and TV Polsat.

The film tells the story of a Polish soldier Franciszek (Franek) Dolas, who—as a result of comical coincidences—is convinced that he started the Second World War. Trying to redeem himself at all costs, he constantly gets into new trouble. In doing so, he finds himself on different war fronts (Yugoslavia, Mediterranean Sea, Middle East, Italy) and eventually returns to Poland.

In a particularly famous scene, Dolas is questioned by a German-speaking Gestapo officer in Austria and answers that his name is "Grzegorz Brzęczyszczykiewicz"; the officer gets increasingly frustrated trying to write the fictitious Polish name.

Cast

See also 
 :pl:Grzegorz Brzęczyszczykiewicz, the alias used by the lead character portrayed in the film

References

External links 
 
 Knee-Slappers: Poland’s Most Beloved Comedies

1970 films
Polish World War II films
Polish black-and-white films
1970 comedy films
Films shot in Azerbaijan
Films about Polish resistance during World War II